Denise Hinkel is a plasma physicist at Lawrence Livermore National Laboratory.

Hinkel received her PhD in physics in 1990 from the University of California, supervised by Burton D. Fried, titled Resonant Absorption In An Inhomogeneous, Unmagnetized Plasma.

In 2007 she became a Fellow of the American Physical Society for "extensive contributions to laser-plasma interaction physics and radiation hydrodynamic design of inertial-confinement fusion targets, and to the fundamental physics of linear and nonlinear wave propagation in plasma."

She was elected to lead American Physical Society Division of Plasma Physics in 2021. Her research involves laser-plasma interactions for nuclear fusion.

Selected publications 
 
 
 Modeling of HF Propagation and Heating in the Ionosphere, (1992)

References

External links 
 

Living people
American women physicists
Plasma physicists
University of California alumni
Lawrence Livermore National Laboratory staff
Fellows of the American Physical Society
Year of birth missing (living people)